You Need Pony Pony Run Run is the first studio album by the Nantes-based power pop band Pony Pony Run Run. It was released on 8 June 2009 as a download, and one week later in compact disc and long play formats. It entered the French albums chart at #104 in its first week after physical release and reached a peak chart position of #78 following the release of the single "Hey You". The second single was "Walking On a Line"

Track listing

Charts

Weekly

Year-end

References

External links
You Need Pony Pony Run Run album information at Amazon

2009 debut albums